Guye railway station is a railway station in Guye District, Tangshan, Hebei, China. It is an intermediate stop on the Qidaoqiao–Luanxian railway.

History 
A passenger service was restored on 18 January 2018 with a shuttle service. There are five trains to and from Tangshan South railway station.

References 

Railway stations in Hebei